The 23rd General Assembly of Nova Scotia represented Nova Scotia between 1864 and 1867.

The assembly sat at the pleasure of the Lieutenant-Governor of Nova Scotia, Charles Hastings Doyle. Richard Graves MacDonnell was governor for Nova Scotia from May 1864 to October 1865. William Fenwick Williams served as governor from 1865 to 1867.

John C. Wade was chosen as speaker for the house.

The assembly was dissolved on June 10, 1867.

List of Members 

Notes:

References 
 Journal and proceedings of the House of Assembly of the province of Nova Scotia, Session 1864 (1864)

Terms of the General Assembly of Nova Scotia
1864 in Canada
1865 in Canada
1866 in Canada
1867 in Canada
1864 establishments in Nova Scotia
1867 disestablishments in Nova Scotia